Nelson Edward Burbrink (December 28, 1921 – April 12, 2001) was an American professional baseball player and scout.  A native of Cincinnati, Ohio, he was signed by the Chicago Cubs as an amateur free agent before the 1941 season and served in the United States Navy during World War II.  After almost a dozen years playing in the minor leagues, Burbrink finally made it to Major League Baseball at the age of 33 with the St. Louis Cardinals.

After being called up to the big leagues in June 1955, Burbrink shared catching duties with teammate Bill Sarni for the remainder of the season.  He made his major league debut on June 5 during a doubleheader against the Brooklyn Dodgers at Ebbets Field.  He appeared in 58 games for St. Louis, going 47-for-170 (.276) with 0 home runs, 15 runs batted in, and 11 runs scored.  He had a .333 on-base percentage and a slugging percentage of .335.

Defensively, he recorded 261 putouts, 24 assists, 6 errors, and participated in 4 double plays.  His fielding percentage was .979, slightly under the league average that season.

After his playing career ended, Burbrink scouted for the Cardinals, New York Mets and Milwaukee Brewers. He served as the Mets' scouting director (1968–72) and director of player development (1973–78).

Burbrink died of cancer in Largo, Florida, at the age of 79.

References

External links

1921 births
2001 deaths
Ashland Colonels players
Baseball players from Cincinnati
Deaths from cancer in Florida
Clinton Cubs players
Davenport Cubs players
Decatur Commodores players
Des Moines Bruins players
Houston Buffaloes players
Los Angeles Angels (minor league) players
Major League Baseball catchers
Major League Baseball farm directors
Major League Baseball scouting directors
Major League Baseball scouts
Marion Cubs players
Milwaukee Brewers scouts
New York Mets executives
New York Mets scouts
Omaha Cardinals players
Rochester Red Wings players
St. Louis Cardinals players
St. Louis Cardinals scouts
Springfield Cubs players
United States Navy personnel of World War II